Simcoe East was a federal electoral district in the province of Ontario, Canada, that was represented in the House of Commons of Canada from 1882 to 1968. This riding was created in 1882 from parts of Muskoka riding.

The "East Riding of the county of Simcoe" initially consisted of the townships of Tay, Medonte, Oro, Orillia, Matchedash, Muskoka, Wood, Medora, Monck and Tiny, the villages of Gravenhurst and Midland, and the towns of Orillia and Penetanguishene.

In 1903, it was redefined to consist of the townships of Matchedash, Medonte, Orillia North, Orillia South, Tay and Tiny, and the towns of Midland, Orillia and Penetanguishene. In 1914, it was redefined to include the villages of Coldwater and Victoria Harbour.

In 1924, it was redefined to consist of that part of the county of Simcoe lying north of (and including) the township of Tiny, the township of Medonte and the township of Orillia South.

The electoral district was abolished in 1966 when it was redistributed between Grey—Simcoe, Parry Sound—Muskoka and Simcoe North ridings.

Members of Parliament

This riding elected the following members of the House of Commons of Canada:

Election results

|-
  
|Liberal
|Hermon Henry Cook  
|align="right"| 1,468
 
|Unknown
|James Quinn
|align="right"| 1,330 

|-
  
|Liberal
|Hermon Henry Cook  
|align="right"| 2,482
 
|Unknown
|James Quinn
|align="right"| 2,408

|-
  
|Liberal
|Philip Howard Spohn
|align="right"|2,850 
  
|Conservative
|William Humphrey Bennett 
|align="right"|2,643   

|-
  
|Conservative
|William Humphrey Bennett
|align="right"|  acclaimed   

|-
  
|Conservative
|William Humphrey Bennett  
|align="right"|2,775    
  
|Liberal
|Hermon Henry Cook  
|align="right"| 2,539 
 
|Patrons of Industry
|D. C. Anderson
|align="right"|1,197    

|-
  
|Conservative
|William Humphrey Bennett 
|align="right"| 3,236   
  
|Liberal
|Hermon Henry Cook  
|align="right"| 3,111   

|-
  
|Conservative
|William Humphrey Bennett 
|align="right"| 3,486    
  
|Liberal
|George Chew
|align="right"| 3,447   

|-
  
|Conservative
|William Humphrey Bennett
|align="right"| 3,116 
  
|Liberal
|Ronald David Gunn
|align="right"| 2,743    

|-
  
|Liberal
|Thomas Edward Manley Chew
|align="right"| 3,417
  
|Conservative
|William Humphrey Bennett
|align="right"| 3,153  

|-
  
|Conservative
|William Humphrey Bennett
|align="right"| 3,315  
  
|Liberal
|Thomas Edward Manley Chew
|align="right"|2,849    

|-
  
|Government (Unionist)
|James Brockett Tudhope
|align="right"|6,669 
  
|Opposition (Laurier Liberals)
|Thomas Edward Manley Chew
|align="right"| 3,076

|-
  
|Liberal
|Thomas Edward Manley Chew
|align="right"| 7,414 
  
|Conservative
|Richard Raikes
|align="right"| 4,810 

|-
  
|Conservative
|Alfred Burke Thompson
|align="right"| 7,658   
  
|Liberal
|Thomas Edward Manley Chew
|align="right"| 6,929    

|-
  
|Conservative
|Alfred Burke Thompson
|align="right"| 7,994    
  
|Liberal
|Fred W. Grant
|align="right"| 7,669   

|-
  
|Conservative
|Alfred Burke Thompson
|align="right"| 7,974    
  
|Liberal
|George McLean
|align="right"| 7,629    

|-
  
|Liberal
|George McLean  
|align="right"| 8,219
  
|Conservative
|John S. Drinkwater
|align="right"| 5,529 

 
|Co-operative Commonwealth
|Frank Tissington 
|align="right"|  1,191   
 
|Independent
|Donald Athenies MacNab
|align="right"| 123  

|-
  
|Liberal
|George McLean
|align="right"| 8,470 
 
|National Government
|Oliver Hereford Smith
|align="right"| 7,024  

|-
  
|Liberal
|William Alfred Robinson
|align="right"|8,508 
  
|Progressive Conservative
|Lloyd Averall Letherby
|align="right"| 6,978
 
|Co-operative Commonwealth
|William Douglas Smith 
|align="right"| 2,109   

|-
  
|Liberal
|William Alfred Robinson
|align="right"|10,030 
  
|Progressive Conservative
|John Elmer Wood
|align="right"|7,976 
 
|Co-operative Commonwealth
|John Edward Skelton
|align="right"| 2,095 
  
|Union of Electors
|Marguerite Marchildon
|align="right"| 404    

|-
  
|Liberal
|William Alfred Robinson
|align="right"| 9,099 
  
|Progressive Conservative
|Philip Bernard Rynard
|align="right"| 8,944
 
|Co-operative Commonwealth
|John Wilson Lovelace
|align="right"|1,310 

|-
  
|Progressive Conservative
|Philip Bernard Rynard
|align="right"| 12,497    
  
|Liberal
|William Alfred Robinson
|align="right"| 8,193
 
|Co-operative Commonwealth
|William Arthur Winchester
|align="right"| 1,395   
 
|Independent
|Charles Parker 
|align="right"|726   

|-
  
|Progressive Conservative
|Philip Bernard Rynard 
|align="right"| 15,149 
  
|Liberal
|John R. MacIsaac 
|align="right"| 7,403 
 
|Co-operative Commonwealth
|William A. Winchester
|align="right"|1,423

|-
  
|Progressive Conservative
|Philip Bernard Rynard
|align="right"| 12,835   
  
|Liberal
|John R. MacIsaac
|align="right"| 8,688 
 
|New Democratic
|Ray A. Ruggles 
|align="right"| 2,346

|-
  
|Progressive Conservative
|Philip Bernard Rynard
|align="right"| 12,662 
  
|Liberal
|Jerome J. Gignac
|align="right"| 9,324 
 
|New Democratic
|C. Perrie Rintoul
|align="right"|2,031 

|-
  
|Progressive Conservative
|Philip Bernard Rynard 
|align="right"|11,648    
  
|Liberal
|Wilson Morden
|align="right"|9,281 
 
|New Democratic
|C. Perrie Rintoul
|align="right"|3,597

See also 

 List of Canadian federal electoral districts
 Past Canadian electoral districts

External links 

 Website of the Parliament of Canada

Former federal electoral districts of Ontario